Assan Tolegenovich Bazayev (born 22 February 1981) is a former professional road bicycle racer from Kazakhstan, who competed as a professional between 2004 and 2013. He competed for the Capec,  and  squads.

In 2004 he won the Hellas Tour, but he did not win any stage.
He also won stage 1 of the 2006 Tour of Germany in August 2006.

Bazayev retired at the end of the 2013 season, after ten years as a professional.

Career achievements

Major results

2003
1st Stage 1 GP Tell
1st Stage 4 Tour of Bulgaria
2004
1st Overall Tour of Hellas
1st  Time trial, Asian Road Championships
2005
3rd Tour de l'Avenir
3rd Kampioenschap van Vlaanderen
2006
1st Stage 1 Deutschland Tour
2008
1st  Road race, National Road Championships
Presidential Cycling Tour of Turkey
1st  Points classification
2009
5th Tour de Luxembourg
2010
2nd  Road race, National Road Championships
8th UCI Road World Championships
2012
1st  Road race, National Road Championships

Grand Tour general classification results timeline

References

External links
 

Kazakhstani male cyclists
1981 births
Living people
Cyclists at the 2012 Summer Olympics
Olympic cyclists of Kazakhstan